"Earthbound" is the fourteenth episode of the first series of Space: 1999. The screenplay was written by Anthony Terpiloff; the director was Charles Crichton. The final shooting script is undated. Live-action filming took place Friday 15 March 1974 through Monday 1 April 1974.

Story
Gerald Simmonds, former executive of the World Space Commission, stands at a window in John Koenig's office, staring into space. Ignoring the proceedings of the weekly command conference he attends, the politician broods over his current situation:  hurtling through space on the runaway Moon, trapped when the atomic explosion of  September 13, 1999 rocketed them out of Earth orbit. Unwilling to accept life on Alpha, the Commissioner is disliked by the entire community. Worse, he still behaves like a visiting dignitary, though bereft of any true authority.

As the meeting adjourns, Simmonds turns from the window and without warning lambastes the senior executives, expressing his disgust at their complacent attitude. Rather than congratulating themselves on how well everyone is coming to terms with life in space, Simmonds insists they should focus on locating and returning to Earth. Koenig refuses to encourage false hope for a task that is scientifically impossible. Simmonds rebuts that, in his experience as a politician, he has observed the 'impossible' takes just a little longer.

The debate is interrupted by a call from Main Mission; an unidentified powered object is approaching the Moon. Computer confirms the vehicle is manned—and on course to enter into an orbit which will carry it directly over Moonbase Alpha. With no reply to their hailing signals, Koenig deploys Eagles One and Two to intercept the alien craft. As they approach, Alan Carter notes that the spacecraft's flight vector is unstable. Rather than achieving orbit, it tumbles toward the Moon surface. At the last moment, landing rockets fire and the vessel softly impacts a short distance from the Moonbase perimeter.

Rejecting Simmonds' attempt to accompany them, Koenig and the crash unit fly to the alien ship. Rescue Eagle Seven touches down next to the silent vessel, docking at what appears to be an entry hatch. Due to the hull's dense molecular structure, Victor Bergman's instruments can gather little information. The team manages to locate and trigger the hatch's opening mechanism and cautiously enter the dimly-lit interior. Surrounding a central column are six free-standing transparent caskets—each containing a motionless humanoid form.

The occupants appear to be in a state of suspended animation. When their instruments register no sign of any metabolic activity, the Alphans consider the possibility the aliens were killed in the crash. Koenig authorises Helena Russell to perform a direct examination. As soon as the doctor begins drilling into a casket, she is blinded by a sudden flare of energy from within and to her horror, the occupant is reduced to ashes. Responding to this destructive act, the central column pulses with light. The remaining five aliens revive, emerging from their hibernacula. Standing nearly seven feet tall, they silently surround Koenig and company.

The leader stoically examines the remains of his comrade, then turns to face the nervous Alphans. Koenig and Helena offer sincere apologies, stating they only violated the seal after the equipment indicated the absence of life. Still silent, the leader extends his hand to Helena, drawing her and the others into a ritualistic circle around their dead companion. During this, Simmonds has been impatiently observing from Main Mission. While he complains over the slow progress of events, Koenig calls in. He orders a crash unit placed on stand-by while the aliens fly their ship over to Alpha.

Landing safely, Koenig escorts the alien contingent into Moonbase. After rudely pushing his way through a throng of curious onlookers, Simmonds is presented to Zantor, captain of the Kaldorian expedition. As the ranking Earth official, the Commissioner assures Zantor those responsible for the death of his crewmember will be brought to account. The alien captain phlegmatically states that the accident was the result of ignorance rather than malice and that Judicial revenge is unnecessary.

Meeting with Koenig and his advisors, the Kaldorians offer the Alphans a token of peace from their home world—the gold-filled eggs of the Libra bird. Zantor explains that they are the product of an ancient and pacifistic culture. With their planet dying, their people dispatched survival ships to every known habitable planet. Bound for Earth, Zantor and his party have travelled for 350 years in stasis. Their ship was programmed to orbit the Moon, allowing the occupants to reanimate before the final descent to Earth. Complications arising from the Moon's extreme change in position led to the crash.

As their computers can calculate a new course to Earth, Zantor announces his decision to continue on. If welcome, the Kaldorians will settle on Earth; if not, they will take their own lives. Helena offers to examine the aliens to determine if they are medically compatible with life on Earth. After they exit, Simmonds comments to himself that the impossible may not take as long as expected. To Koenig's disgust, the politician suggests disposing of the peaceful Kaldorians and seizing their vessel to return home.

Helena's staff conducts a thorough examination of the aliens. As they wait for Computer to process the data, Helena and Zantor discuss the Kaldorian suspension process. Cryogenic freezing, he says, is inadequate to suspend life; their system creates a cycle of accelerated energy which holds all the body's cells in stasis. Taking her hand, Zantor comments her beauty would be enhanced by the peace of suspended animation. Though respectful, his interest in the doctor is clearly more than platonic. The moment is interrupted by Computer's analysis:  the Kaldorians are sufficiently human to exist on Earth.

Helena escorts her admirer to the Eagle maintenance hangar, where the Kaldorian ship has been installed. Zantor expresses his wish to complete repairs and depart within twenty hours. Should Koenig permit them to proceed, the captain offers the now-vacant berth on his vessel to one of the Alphans. Koenig orders Helena and Bergman to verify that the stasis procedure is safe for a human being. As the Commander leaves the ship, he is stalked by Simmonds, who repeats his earlier proposal. Refusing to betray the Kaldorians, Koenig plans to accept Zantor's offer. The computer will be programmed to select one person to go home.

Later, there is an emergency call from the spaceship. Koenig is shocked to find Helena lying in one of the stasis chambers. Unwilling to risk anyone else's life, the doctor insisted on testing the procedure herself. Since two attempts to reverse the process have failed, the Alphans believe she is dead. Zantor insists Helena is in suspended animation, but at more intense a level than is suitable for the human body. Reanimation from such a deep sleep, he admits, may result in brain damage. Concerned for her well-being, the alien captain makes a final attempt to revive her. While Koenig watches anxiously, her eyes open in a blank stare. To his relief, she then focuses on him and they exchange loving smiles.

Later, David Kano presents Koenig with Computer's selection for the return to Earth, there are  three suitable candidates. Even though the journey will take seventy-five years, the staff is excited at the prospect of someone going home. In private, Simmonds criticises Koenig for permitting a machine to make this decision. The Commissioner then selfishly proclaims himself to be the obvious choice; he serves no useful purpose on Alpha. Though Koenig would love nothing more than to be rid of the insufferable politician, he insists the choice will be objective.

The confrontation is interrupted by the arrival of Zantor. With repairs completed, the alien has come to make his farewells, inquiring who has been selected for the journey. Koenig asks Helena and Bergman for a final verdict on the stasis procedure. Having grasped the basic principles, they declare it safe for human use. The key is the alien computer having a complete matrix of the individual; should someone other than Helena go, one specific matrix for that person must be made. The launch countdown begins, and Koenig orders Kano to have Computer make the final selection.

Simmonds has decided his fate will not be decided by Koenig's lottery. After secretly swapping commlocks with the Commander, he slips away unnoticed. Now with unlimited access provided by the command commlock, he obtains a stun-gun and proceeds to the Main Power Unit. Upon discovering the switch, Koenig orders the command commlock cancelled—but not before the conniving politician has shot the sentries and entered the restricted area.

Inside, Simmonds stuns all but one operative, then forces the man to remove a key component from the main converter assembly. Power instantly fails throughout the base. When Koenig calls for the Commissioner's surrender, Simmonds announces the converter is his hostage. Unless he is given the vacant berth, Moonbase will freeze over and everyone will die. Koenig has no choice but to concede to Simmonds' demands. With the lives of the entire community at stake, Zantor agrees. The noble Kaldorian becomes Simmonds' new hostage in exchange for the converter.

After power is restored, Simmonds and his captive depart, the Kaldorian giving Helena a wistful farewell gaze before being led away at gunpoint. Once aboard the ship, Zantor directs Simmonds to his travel position. The suspicious politician, unaware that a personalised matrix of his body still needs to be compiled, insists the alien captain enter his chamber first. Eyeing the Commissioner's weapon, a silent Zantor does as he is told. With the six travellers in place, the ship blasts off for Earth.

A few hours later, Main Mission receives a signal from the Kaldorian ship. It is Simmonds. He is calling Earth, believing the seventy-five-year voyage to be over. The staff is puzzled by the premature awakening. Did Simmonds not allow a matrix to be compiled?  Or is this Zantor's version of justice?  On the ship, Simmonds sits up in his chamber, irritated by the lack of response. He calls up the time on his comlink and is horrified to see that only two hours forty-eight minutes have elapsed since take-off.

Panicked, he thrashes around in his chamber, screaming for help. With the Kaldorian ship well beyond Eagle range, Koenig can do nothing. Simmonds' desperate pleas to his fellow travellers—still in suspended animation—are also wasted. After throwing his body against the unyielding walls of the stasis chamber, the politician finally collapses in what will be his coffin.
On Alpha, Koenig and Helena reflect on the tragic irony of the situation when the Commander reveals Computer's final choice for the voyage home:  Simmonds.

Cast

Starring
 Martin Landau — Commander John Koenig
 Barbara Bain — Doctor Helena Russell

Also starring
 Barry Morse — Professor Victor Bergman

Guest artist
 Roy Dotrice — Commissioner Gerald Simmonds

Special guest star
 Christopher Lee — Captain Zantor

Featuring
 Prentis Hancock — Controller Paul Morrow
 Clifton Jones — David Kano
 Zienia Merton — Sandra Benes
 Anton Phillips — Doctor Bob Mathias
 Nick Tate — Captain Alan Carter

Uncredited artists
 Suzanne Roquette — Tanya
 Andrew Dempsey — Main Mission Operative
 Tony Allyn — Security Guard One (Tony)
 Quentin Pierre — Security Guard Two
 Barbara Kelly — Computer Voice

Music
The score was re-edited from previous Space: 1999 incidental music tracks composed for the first series by Barry Gray and draws primarily from "Breakaway" and "Black Sun".

Production notes
 Christopher Lee had recently completed his role as million-dollar assassin Francisco Scaramanga in the ninth James Bond film The Man With the Golden Gun when he came aboard as the noble alien Captain Zantor. Lee was famous on both sides of the Atlantic for his portrayal of the Frankenstein monster and Count Dracula in his many Hammer Films appearances. In recent years, Lee has played the wizard Saruman in Peter Jackson's The Lord of the Rings film trilogy and the villainous Count Dooku in George Lucas' Star Wars prequels Star Wars: Episode II – Attack of the Clones and Star Wars: Episode III – Revenge of the Sith. Lee passed away in 2015 at the age of 93. 
 Production designer Keith Wilson was responsible for the hair, makeup and costume design for the first series. When creating the Kaldorians, Wilson envisioned the bridges of their noses being built up with appliances to render a flat plane from nose to forehead. Christopher Lee objected to the uncomfortable makeup—especially when its removal also removed a layer of skin from the involved area. This was also the first time Lee, standing six feet four inches tall, was asked to stand on an 'apple box' to increase his height: the aliens were envisioned as being at least six-foot-six.
 Responding to complaints from directors and cameramen regarding the difficulty they experienced shooting on the Main Mission set, Wilson made a major modification prior to this episode. Originally, the set was designed with a platform running along three sides, giving the operations area a 'sunken' effect. The platform and steps were removed from one side, opposite the computer-bank wall. The four windows there were placed on the studio floor and, being 'wild' (i.e. movable), allowed for greater camera access. Wilson also broke up the tight formation of desks, improving the traffic flow through the room.

Novelization
The character of Commissioner Simmonds was killed off by E. C. Tubb in the first Space: 1999 novel Breakaway. As author Brian Ball was unable to rework the story without the scheming politician, "Earthbound" was withdrawn from its intended place in the third Year One Space: 1999 novel The Space Guardians. Ball incorporated certain elements into his adaptation of "Missing Link":  Raan's illusory Victor Bergman was given the avaricious intention of seizing an alien ship to travel home.

In 2003, the story was novelised by Tubb and released in Space: 1999 - Earthbound. Minor additions to the story include: (1) As to not violate the novels' continuity, it is stated that Simmonds was left for dead in the confusion of the breakaway, but was resuscitated by Bob Mathias. His broken neck and fractured skull were repaired and the weeks spent recovering in Medical explained his absence; (2) The Kaldorians were found to emit pheromones that make people like them, explaining the instant acceptance of the aliens by Koenig and his boarding party.

References

External links
Space: 1999 - "Earthbound" - The Catacombs episode guide
Space: 1999 - "Earthbound" - Moonbase Alpha's Space: 1999 page

1975 British television episodes
Space: 1999 episodes